The South African type XC tender was a steam locomotive tender from the pre-Union era in Transvaal.

The Type XC tender entered service in 1910 and 1911, as tenders to the   Pacific type steam locomotives which were acquired by the Central South African Railways. These locomotives were designated Class 10C on the South African Railways in 1912.

Manufacturer
Twelve Type XC tenders were built in 1910 by the North British Locomotive Company (NBL).

The Central South African Railways (CSAR) placed twelve Class 10-C Pacific type locomotives in service in 1911 and 1912. The locomotive and tender were designed in 1910 by G.G. Elliot, Chief Mechanical Engineer of the CSAR, at its Pretoria works.

The Type XC entered service as tenders to these locomotives, which were acquired for light passenger working on the Reef.

Characteristics

Locomotive
Only the Class 10C locomotives were delivered new with Type XC tenders. In the South African Railways (SAR) years, tenders were numbered for the engines they were delivered with. In most cases, an oval number plate, bearing the engine number and often also the locomotive class and tender type, would be attached to the rear end of the tender. During the classification and renumbering of locomotives onto the SAR roster in 1912, no separate classification and renumbering list was published for tenders, which should have been renumbered according to the locomotive renumbering list. Bearing in mind that tenders could and did migrate between engines, these tenders should have been numbered in the SAR number range from 767 to 778.

Classification letters
Since many tender types are interchangeable between different locomotive classes and types, a tender classification system was adopted by the SAR. The first letter of the tender type indicates the classes of engines to which it can be coupled. The "X_" tenders could be used with the locomotive classes as shown.
 Cape Government Railways Mountain, SAR Class 4.
 SAR Class 4A.
 SAR Class 5.
 Cape Government Railways 6th Class of 1897, SAR Class 6B.
 Oranje-Vrijstaat Gouwerment-Spoorwegen 6th Class L3, SAR Class 6E.
 Cape Government Railways 6th Class of 1901 (Neilson, Reid), SAR Class 6H.
 Cape Government Railways 6th Class of 1902, SAR Class 6J.
 Cape Government Railways 8th Class of 1902, SAR Class 8.
 Imperial Military Railways 8th Class, SAR Class 8A.
 CSAR Class 8-L2, SAR Class 8B.
 CSAR Class 8-L3, SAR Class 8C.
 Cape Government Railways 8th Class 4-8-0 of 1903, SAR Class 8D.
 Cape Government Railways 8th Class Experimental, SAR Class 8E.
 Cape Government Railways 8th Class 4-8-0 of 1904, SAR Class 8F.
 Cape Government Railways 8th Class 2-8-0 of 1903, SAR Class 8Y.
 Cape Government Railways 8th Class 2-8-0 of 1904, SAR Class 8Z.
 CSAR Class 9, SAR Class 9.
 CSAR Class 10, SAR Class 10.
 CSAR Class 10-2 Saturated, SAR Class 10A.
 CSAR Class 10-2 Superheated. SAR Class 10B.
 CSAR Class 10-C, SAR Class 10C.
 CSAR Class 11, SAR Class 11.
 Cape Government Railways 9th Class of 1903, SAR Class Experimental 4.
 Cape Government Railways 9th Class of 1906, SAR Class Experimental 5.
 Cape Government Railways 10th Class, SAR Class Experimental 6.
 SAR Class ME.
 CSAR Mallet Superheated, SAR Class MF.

The second letter indicates the tender's water capacity.

A number, when added after the letter code, indicates differences between similar tender types, such as function, wheelbase or coal bunker capacity.

Rebuilding
The Class 10C locomotives were soon found to be capable of handling mainline passenger trains and they were therefore equipped with new and larger Type XM2 tenders.

From c. 1925, the redundant Type XC tenders were completely rebuilt by the SAR by mounting a completely new upper structure on the existing underframe, with new water tanks and a larger coal capacity. These rebuilt tenders had a more modern appearance, with flush sides all the way to the top of the coal bunker. They were reclassified as Type XF.

The program to rebuild several older tender types with new upper structures was begun by Col F.R. Collins DSO, who approved several of the detailed drawings for the work during his term in office as Chief Mechanical Engineer of the SAR from 1922 to 1929. It was continued by his successor, A.G. Watson.

Illustration

References

XC